Nigara Shaheen (born 7 June 1994) is an Afghani judoka based in Canada.

Life
Nigara Shaheen was born in Afghanistan. When she was six months old, her family moved from Jalalabad to Pakistan, fleeing the Afghan War. At age 18, she moved to Kabul to study at the American University of Afghanistan.

Shaheen lives in Russia. She competed at the 2017 Asian Judo Championships, 2019 Judo Grand Slam, 2020 Judo Grand Slam, and 2021 Judo Grand Slam. She qualified for the 2020 Summer Olympics, on the Refugee Olympic Team. She competed in the women's 70 kg event at the 2020 Summer Olympics in Tokyo, Japan.

References

External links
 
 Nigara Shaheen: judo is stronger than geopolitics at JudoHeart.com

1993 births
Living people
Afghan female judoka
Afghan expatriate sportspeople in Russia
Refugee Olympic Team at the 2020 Summer Olympics
Judoka at the 2020 Summer Olympics